Waldemar Glinka (born January 9, 1968) is a former Polish long-distance runner.

Glinka finished 34th in the marathon at the 2004 Summer Olympics.

Glinka won the 2000 Hannover Marathon with a time of 2:12.55.

References

External links

1968 births
Living people
Polish male long-distance runners
Polish male marathon runners
Olympic athletes of Poland
Athletes (track and field) at the 2004 Summer Olympics
Place of birth missing (living people)